Joseph Hammill (birth unknown – death unknown) was a professional rugby league footballer who played in the 1910s. He played at club level for Dewsbury and Hull F.C. (Heritage №), as a forward (prior to the specialist positions of), during the era of contested scrums.

Playing career

Challenge Cup Final appearances
Joe Hammill played as a forward in Dewsbury's 8-5 victory over Oldham in the 1912 Challenge Cup Final during the 1911-12 season at Headingley Rugby Stadium, Leeds on Saturday 27 April 1912 in front of a crowd of 16,000, and played as a forward in Hull FC's 6-0 victory over Wakefield Trinity in the 1914 Challenge Cup Final during the 1913–14 season at Thrum Hall, Halifax, in front of a crowd of 19,000.

References

External links
Search for "Hammill" at rugbyleagueproject.org
Search for "Hamill" at rugbyleagueproject.org
Search for "Joseph Hammill" at britishnewspaperarchive.co.uk
Search for "Joe Hammill" at britishnewspaperarchive.co.uk
Search for "Joseph Hamill" at britishnewspaperarchive.co.uk
Search for "Joe Hamill" at britishnewspaperarchive.co.uk

Dewsbury Rams players
English rugby league players
Hull F.C. players
Place of birth missing
Place of death missing
Rugby league forwards
Year of birth missing
Year of death missing